Wake Up My Soul is the debut album by worship artist Matt Redman.

Track listing
 Disc - Total Time (51:06)
"Wake Up, My Soul"
"Here am I, A Sinner Free" 
"Glory to my King" 
"There's a Sound of Singing"
"The Angels, Lord, they sing" 
"You Give me Love" 
"The Works of His Hands" 
"Oh, How I Love Jesus" 
"I've got a Love Song" 
"Now unto the King"
"No Longer Just Servants"

Personnel
Matt Redman – acoustic guitar, vocals

Release details
1993, UK, Kingsway Records KMCD781, Release Date ? ? 1993, CD
2000, UK, Survivor Records SURCD040, Release Date 21 July 2000, CD (double CD with "Passion For Your Name")

1993 debut albums
Matt Redman albums